Michael Roger Goff (born September 30, 1962) is an American baseball coach and former infielder, who is a current assistant baseball coach for the Arizona State Sun Devils. 

Goff was a coach for the Seattle Mariners from August  through , serving as first base coach before being promoted to bench coach when John McLaren was named manager in June 2007. On October 5, 2007, it was announced that his contract would not be renewed; Goff had worked in the Mariners system since 1992. A former second baseman and native of Mobile, Alabama, Goff was selected by the Boston Red Sox in the 21st round (535th overall) of the June 1984 draft out of the University of Alabama at Birmingham. He played for four seasons (1984–1987) in the Boston farm system, peaking at the Double-A level.

After leaving the Mariners, Goff managed in the Cincinnati Reds and San Francisco Giants organizations (2008–2011; 2013–2014). He was hired as the bench coach by the Miami Marlins on May 18, 2015.

He resides in Midlothian, Virginia, with his wife, Mary, and three children, Crystal, Katie, and Connor.

References

External links

 Coach's page from Retrosheet
 MLB.com Profile
 Arizona State Sun Devils bio

1962 births
Living people
Chattanooga Lookouts managers
Elmira Pioneers players
Greensboro Hornets players
Major League Baseball bench coaches
Major League Baseball first base coaches
Miami Marlins scouts
Miami Marlins coaches
New Britain Red Sox players
Seattle Mariners coaches
Sportspeople from Mobile, Alabama
UAB Blazers baseball players
Winter Haven Red Sox players
People from Midlothian, Virginia
South Alabama Jaguars baseball coaches
Arizona State Sun Devils baseball coaches